The Austrian Regional League Central is a third-tier division of Austrian football, established in the 1994–95 season. It covers the Austrian states of Carinthia (with East Tyrol), Styria and Upper Austria and is one of three leagues at this level.

Recent league champions 
The most recent league champions:

2022–23 member clubs 

 USV Allerheiligen
 TuS Bad Gleichenberg
 Deutschlandsberger SC
 FC Gleisdorf 09
 SC Kalsdorf
 SV Ried II
 SV Spittal/Drau
 ATSV Stadl-Paura
 SAK Klagenfurt
 USV St. Anna
 SK Treibach
 Union Gurten
 UVB Vöcklamarkt
 ELIN Weiz
 FC Wels
 Hertha Wels
 Wolfsberger AC II
 DSV Leoben

References

External links
Regional League Central (in German only)
Austrian Regional League Central tables & results at soccerway.com

Cen